Egilsstaðir Airport  is a single-runway international airport in Egilsstaðir, Iceland. The main carrier is Icelandair with flights to Reykjavík. The airport has several car rental options available, such as Höldur/Europcar, Hertz and Avis/Budget. Egilsstaðir also serves as a diversion airport for Keflavik International Airport located 415 kilometers southwest of Egilstaðir.

History
Originally a gravel runway was made in 1951 and in 1954 it was equipped with runway lights. On the 23rd of September 1993, a new asphalt runway replaced the older gravel runway on the other side of the terminal. The air terminal was originally built in 1968, but was rebuilt and expanded during 1987 to 1999. A new arrivals hall was opened in 2007. It is mainly used for domestic flights to Reykjavík, but there has been a route to Copenhagen, and charter flight from London and Edinburgh, UK (the tour operator Discover the World chartered flights in 2016 but has later preferred regular tickets to Keflavik for its escorted Iceland trips). From May 2023, Egilsstaðir Airport will see scheduled international flights again with Condor, a German holiday-carrier, starting flights to Frankfurt.

Airlines and destinations
The following airlines operate regular scheduled and charter flights at Egilsstaðir Airport:

Statistics

See also
Transport in Iceland
List of airports in Iceland

References

External links

OurAirports - Egilsstaðir
OpenStreetMap - Egilsstaðir

Airports in Iceland
International airports in Iceland